Extended Play is the debut EP from Denver Harbor. It was first released by the band on December 16, 2003, featuring a skit at the very end of the CD, about a hung-over girl who wakes up in bed next to a stranger. After the first print run of the EP sold out, Denver Harbor re-recorded the songs for the second printing, issued on April 20, 2004. The artwork stayed the same and the easiest way to tell the versions apart is said outro, which was removed for the second edition.

Track listing
(all songs written by Will Salazar)
"Picture Perfect Wannabe" – 4:00
"Outta My Head" – 3:30
"Satisfied" – 4:15
"Way Back Home" – 3:49
"Pop Manifesto" – 11:02

Personnel 
Chris Lewis – guitar
Aaron Rubin – bass
Ilan Rubin – drums
Will Salazar – vocals, guitar

2003 debut EPs
Denver Harbor albums